The Tulane University School of Science and Engineering (SSE) was established in the fall of 2005 as part of the Tulane Renewal Plan, when the Faculty of the Liberal Arts and Sciences and the School of Engineering were reorganized into two schools, the School of Liberal Arts and the School of Science and Engineering.

Degree programs
Tulane SSE offers degrees in biological chemistry, biomedical engineering, cell and molecular biology, chemical and biomolecular engineering, chemistry, earth and environmental science, ecology and evolutionary biology, environmental biology, environmental geoscience, geology, materials science and engineering, mathematics, neuroscience, physics, psychology, and statistics.  In addition, a minor is offered in engineering science.computer science

Location
A ten-building complex on Tulane University's Uptown New Orleans campus includes the Lindy Claiborne Boggs Center for Energy and Biotechnology, the Merryl and Sam Israel Jr. Environmental Sciences Building, Pervical Stern Hall, Stanley O. Thomas Hall, Alcee Fortier Hall, Walter E. Blessey Hall, and the Francis M. Taylor Laboratories.  Other buildings include the J. Bennett Johnston Health and Environmental Research Building in Downtown New Orleans, the Reily Student Recreation Center, and facilities at University Square.  The Reily Center houses the Center for Anatomical and Movement Sciences (CAMS) as well as the Tulane Institute of Sports Medicine (TISM).

Campus improvements
In November 2008, the university announced that donors would fund a project to create a more pedestrian-friendly environment by eliminating a street with automobile traffic that bisected the center of the campus. Referred to as the McAlister Place project, the street was replaced with a crushed-granite surface bordered with Japanese magnolias and irises, and completed in January 2010.

After Hurricane Katrina, the City of New Orleans improved bicycle lanes on nearby Carrollton Avenue and in 2011, announced plans to add bicycle lanes to the St. Charles Avenue corridor that runs in front of campus.

Notable professors
 Frank Tipler
 Alexander Wentzell
 Thomas W. Sherry
 James MacLaren
 John P. Perdew

See also
Tulane University
Newcomb-Tulane College
Notable Alumni

References

External links
Official webpage

Tulane University
Engineering schools and colleges in the United States
Engineering universities and colleges in Louisiana
Educational institutions established in 2005
2005 establishments in Louisiana